Zorotypus absonus is an extinct species of insect in the order Zoraptera. It was described by Michael S. Engel in 2008 from a fossil found in Dominican amber, and it lived during the Miocene epoch.

References 

absonus
Miocene insects
Prehistoric insects of the Caribbean
Fossil taxa described in 2008
Taxa named by Michael S. Engel
Dominican amber
Fossils of the Dominican Republic